Richard Preston "Dickie" Bell (born October 26, 1946) is an American politician. He was a Republican member of the Virginia House of Delegates from 2010-2020, representing the 20th district, which includes parts of Augusta, Highland, and Rockingham counties, and the city of Staunton, where Bell resides.

Bell did not seek reelection in the 2019 election.

Electoral history

References

External links
Virginia House of Delegates bio
Official website

Republican Party members of the Virginia House of Delegates
American educators
Politicians from Staunton, Virginia
21st-century American politicians
1946 births
Living people